Javier Marín is a Mexican artist.

Biography

Marín was born in 1962 in Uruapan, Michoacán. He got his education through Academy of San Carlos and the National Autonomous University of Mexico. During his 30-year career he had 270 exhibitions in Canada, Mexico, the United States and a few of South American countries. Most of his exhibitions were held in Mexico Citys museums such as Museum of Modern Art and National Print Museum and also the US museums such as Museum of Fine Arts, Boston and the Santa Barbara Museum of Art. In 2008 he was awarded with the Prize of the Third International Beijing Biennial in Beijing, China. In 2010 he made a retablo for the Zacatecas Cathedral as well.

Exhibitions 
Marín is represented by Art of the World Gallery in Houston, Texas. An exhibition of his works is scheduled to open January 2019 in Houston.

List of works 
 Cabeza Vainilla

References

External links
 

1962 births
Living people
Mexican artists
People from Uruapan
Artists from Michoacán